"Had to Phone Ya" is a song by the American rock band the Beach Boys from their 1976 album 15 Big Ones. It was written by Brian Wilson, his sister-in-law Diane Rovell, and Mike Love. The song was issued as the B-side to their single "It's O.K.". An earlier recording by the group American Spring was included as a bonus track on a later reissue of the album Spring (1972).

Background
Brian Wilson and Mike Love wrote the song, with Diane Rovell also contributing. Diane was originally listed as a cowriter, but her name was removed from songwriting credits in subsequent releases. She is still listed as co-writer in the Broadcast Music, Inc. database.

Byron Preiss described the song's creation by Brian Wilson while his wife Marilyn was away in Europe. Brian spoke about the song in 1995: 

Lindsay Planer of Allmusic noted "Although the tune may sound uncomplicated, it is part of a larger sonic tapestry that combines the interaction of several simultaneous melodies." noting similarities to earlier Brian Wilson compositions "Good Vibrations" and "Love to Say Dada". Musician Dennis Diken compared it to Wilson's "Trombone Dixie".

"Had to Phone Ya" was originally recorded in 1973 by American Spring at Junior's Motel in Otho, Iowa. Their version was released as a bonus track for the CD reissue of the album Spring (1972).

Recording
The Beach Boys' version of "Had to Phone Ya" was recorded on March 30, 1976, at Brother Studios in the middle of the primary sessions for 15 Big Ones. The lead vocals are swapped between the band members. The instrumental track from this session was made available on the 2013 compilation Made in California.

Personnel
Per album liner notes.

The Beach Boys
 Al Jardine – lead, harmony and backing vocals
 Mike Love – lead, harmony and backing vocals
 Brian Wilson – lead, harmony and backing vocal; acoustic grand piano
 Carl Wilson – lead, harmony and backing vocals
 Dennis Wilson – lead, harmony and backing vocals; drums

Guest
 Marilyn Wilson – spoken word and backing vocals

Session musicians and production staff

References 

1976 songs
The Beach Boys songs
Songs written by Brian Wilson
Songs written by Mike Love
Song recordings produced by Brian Wilson
Songs about loneliness
Songs about telephone calls